The final of the 2009 ICC Champions Trophy cricket tournament was played on 5 October 2009 between New Zealand and Australia at the SuperSport Park, Centurion. Australia qualified into the final by defeating England in the first semi final while New Zealand defeated Pakistan in the second semi final. Australia won the final by 6 wickets, their second consecutive Champions Trophy final.

Road to the Final

First Semi-Final
The first semi final was played between Australia and England on 2 October 2009 at the SuperSport Park, Centurion. England batted first and set target of 258 which Australia achieved in 41.2 overs. Shane Watson and Ricky Ponting scored 136 and 111 runs—both not out—sharing 252 runs from 242 balls, Australia highest partnership in One Day Internationals (ODIs). Watson was given man of the match award.

Second Semi-Final
New Zealand played Pakistan in the second semi-final at the New Wanderers Stadium, Johannesburg, and defeated them by 5 wickets. Achieving the target of 234 runs, New Zealand highest scorer was Grant Elliott, with 75 not out. Daniel Vettori earned the man of the match award for his all-round performance; he took 3 wickets for 43 runs in 10 overs and scored 41 runs.

Result
The final of the 2009 ICC Champions Trophy was played between Australia and New Zealand at the SuperSport Park on 5 October 2009. Batting first after winning the toss, New Zealand posted a total of 200 runs for 9 wickets in 50 overs. Australia, in the reply, were initially restrict to 41 runs for 3 wickets in 18 overs, and the Kyle Mills and Shane Bond appeared with bowling figures like: 6–2–8–1 and 5–2–9–1 respectively. Shane Watson and Cameron White were playing in a "Test match-mode", but got momentum later with White scoring 61 runs off 102 balls and Watson 105 not out from 129 balls. With back-to-back sixes, Watson completed his century and achieved the target. Australia reach the target in 45.4 overs losing 4 wickets. This was the second consecutive occasion for Watson earning man of the match award in the final of ICC Champions Trophy. It was Australia's fifth consecutive win after becoming finalists in multi-team tournaments since 1999.

The Final

References

External links

2009
International cricket competitions in 2009
Final